The Golden Horse Lifetime Achievement Award is an award presented annually at the Golden Horse Awards by the Taipei Golden Horse Film Festival Executive Committee. The latest ceremony was held in 2022, with Lai Cheng-ying and Chang Chao-tang receiving the honors.

References

Golden Horse Film Awards
Lifetime achievement awards